Crassispira bifurca is a species of sea snail, a marine gastropod mollusk in the family Pseudomelatomidae.

Description
The length of the shell attains 21 mm, its diameter 7 mm.

The elongate shell has a pyramidal shape. It contains 12 whorls. The upper part of the whorls is  carinate close to the suture and below  concave and faintly striate. Below they show a series of 10 large tubercles  The aperture is small, measuring 3/8 of the total length. The outer lip is slightly sinuate above the nodules. The siphonal canal is very short. The general colour of this shell is dirty yellowish,.The lower half of the upper whorls between the nodules are black, as is also the middle portion of the body whorl. The four spiral series of little tubercles on the fine ribs of the body whorl are bright yellow. That two riblets bifurcate from each of the large tubercles is very remarkable.

Distribution
This marine species occurs in the Pacific Ocean off Panama.

References

External links
 Smith, E.A. (1888) Diagnoses of new species of Pleurotomidae in the British Museum. Annals and Magazine of Natural History, series 6, 2, 300–317
 
 
 James H. McLean & Roy Poorman, A Revised Classification of the Family Turridae, with the Proposal of New Subfamilies, Genera, and Subgenera from the Eastern Pacific; The Veliger  vol. 14, 1971

bifurca
Gastropods described in 1888